This is a list of venues used for professional baseball in New Orleans, Louisiana. The information is a compilation of the information contained in the references listed.

Crescent City Base Ball Park or Sportsman's Park
Home of:
New Orleans Pelicans – Southern League (1887–mid-1888) league disbanded – club transferred to Texas League mid-1888 – it also failed
New Orleans Pelicans – Southern League (1889) disbanded after season
New Orleans Pelicans – Southern League (1892–1896) disbanded after season
New Orleans Pelicans – Southern League (1898–1899) disbanded after 1899
Location: New Basin Canal (now covered by Pontchartrain Expressway aka Interstate-10); across from Greenwood Cemetery; Metairie Road / City Park Avenue. Contemporary city directories give the location as "New Basin Canal and South Metairie Rd"

Athletic Park
Home of: New Orleans Pelicans – Southern Association (1901–1907)
Location: Tulane Avenue (northeast, right field); South Pierce Street (northwest, left field); Scott Street (southeast, first base); New Basin Canal (southwest, third base) - across Pierce from later Pelican Stadium site

Pelican Park
Home of:
New Orleans Pelicans – Southern Association (1908–1914)
New Orleans Little Pels - Cotton States League (1912) moved to Yazoo City, Mississippi after a few weeks
Location: South Carrollton Avenue (northwest, home plate); Palmyra Street (northeast, left field); Pierce Street (southeast, center field); Banks Street (southwest, right field)
Currently: commercial businesses

Pelican Stadium originally Heinemann Park (1915–1937)
Home of:
New Orleans Pelicans – Southern Association (1915–1957)
New Orleans Ads aka New Orleans Black Pelicans – Negro Southern League (1920)
New Orleans–St. Louis Stars – Negro American League (1941) – half their home games (other half in St. Louis)
New Orleans Creoles – late 1940s
Location: South Carrollton Avenue (northwest, home plate); Tulane Avenue (northeast, third base / left field); Gravier Street, railroad tracks, canal (southwest, first base / right field); Pierce Street (southeast, center field).
Currently: commercial / retail

City Park Stadium later renamed Tad Gormley Stadium
Home of: New Orleans Pelicans – Southern Association (1958–1959) – disbanded after 1959 season
Location: New Orleans City Park – 5400 Stadium Drive (south); Marconi Drive (west); Roosevelt Mall Street (north and east)

Louisiana Superdome – later renamed Mercedes-Benz Superdome and now Caesars Superdome
Home of: New Orleans Pelicans – American Association (1977) – moved from Tulsa Oilers of 1932–1942 and 1946–1976 – disbanded after 1977 season
Location: 1500 Sugar Bowl Drive and Poydras Street (northeast); Lasalle Street (southeast); Stadium Drive and Howard Avenue (southwest); Stadium Drive and US-90 (northwest)

See also
Lists of baseball parks

References

External links
History of New Orleans ballparks
Sanborn map showing Athletic Park, 1908
Sanborn map showing Pelican Park, 1908
Sanborn map showing Pelican Stadium, 1950

New Orleans
Baseball venues
baseball parks